The 1933 Brooklyn Dodgers season was their fourth in the league. The team improved on their previous season's output of 3–9, winning five games. Despite shutting out five of their opponents, they were also shut out in three games and they failed to qualify for the playoffs for the second consecutive season.

Schedule

Standings

References

Brooklyn Dodgers (NFL) seasons
Brooklyn Dodgers (NFL)
Brooklyn
1930s in Brooklyn
Flatbush, Brooklyn